Shelltown is a neighborhood located within Southeast San Diego, approximately 5 minutes from downtown San Diego by car and 25 minutes by bicycle. It is bordered by National City on the south, Interstate 5 and Barrio Logan on the west, 43rd Avenue (a continuation of Highland Avenue) on the east, and Gamma Court and the neighborhood of Southcrest on the north. Prior to the 1980s the northern border of Shelltown was National Ave and many residents still consider that the northern border.

Due to the predominance of shells in the sandy soil, the neighborhood became known as "Shelltown." Located on a plateau just north and east of the 32nd Street Naval Station, Shelltown was a favorite location of housing for many of the early naval officers.  Their ships were visible from their homes and were only moments away in the event they were called to duty  The majority of Shelltown consists of residential homes built between 1920 and 1969.  The Naval Base San Diego, an industrial park, and some commercial buildings are located just outside the western border of Shelltown along Main Street.

Mexican Americans have a long history in the area and began living in the area as early as the 1910s.

With the great influx of Filipino immigrants joining the United States Navy, especially from the Vietnam War era on to the 1990s, many Filipinos inhabited the Southeast San Diego neighborhoods of Alta Vista, Bay Terraces, Paradise Hills, Shelltown, Skyline Hills, and Valencia Park, both for the relatively affordable housing prices and its close proximity to Naval Base San Diego.

Shelltown/Southcrest contains a large mural, which is one of three by several artists that were done near three Southeast San Diego neighborhood entrances. Local activist and muralist Mario Torero was the lead artist for the Alpha Street piece.

San Diego’s Southcrest Trails Park is located just north of the Shelltown neighborhood within the Chollas Creek floodplain, part of the smallest watershed in San Diego and containing the highest population density. The Park itself is located south of Boston Avenue and west of South 38th Street. The park was scheduled to be completed in December 2012 

An upgrade to the park was started in March 2017 and was completed on Spring of 2018.

Schools

Balboa Elementary School 
Balboa Elementary School was recognized as one of six nationwide winners of the 2007 Intel Schools of Distinction awards, for excellence in math education in an elementary school program.

Transportation
The area is served by the San Diego Trolley Blue Line at the Pacific Fleet station and the Route 929 bus via Main Street.  The neighborhood also has quick access to Interstate 5, Interstate 15, and Interstate 805.

References 

Neighborhoods in San Diego
Urban communities in San Diego